Waseem Williams (born 8 January 1997) is a Jamaican sprinter from Kingston, Jamaica specializing in the 100m and 200m. Williams attended Jamaica College before going on to compete for Purdue University.

References

External links
 
Purdue Boilermakers Bio

1997 births
Living people
Jamaican male sprinters
Sportspeople from Kingston, Jamaica
Purdue Boilermakers men's track and field athletes